The Bosnian Women's Cup is the national women's football cup competition in Bosnia and Herzegovina.

Format
The cup finals were played as single leg ties until 2013. Since 2014 the finals are contested over two legs.

List of finals
The list of finals:

Additional SFK 2000 won a title in 2002 or 2003. With fourteen titles they are the record champions.

See also
Bosnia and Herzegovina Football Cup, men's edition

References

External links
Cup at federation website

Bos
Women's football competitions in Bosnia and Herzegovina
Women